Nhà Bè Base (also known as Nhà Bè Naval Support Activity or Nhà Bè Logistics Support Base) is a former U.S. Navy and Republic of Vietnam Navy (RVNN) base in Nhà Bè District in Saigon (now Ho Chi Minh City) of Vietnam now used as a base by the Vietnam Coast Guard.

History

The base was first established by the US Navy in May 1966 to support Operation Game Warden and particularly patrolling of the Rung Sat Special Zone. Mine Squadron 11, Detachment Alpha equipped with 12 minesweeping boats (MSBs) ( long, wooden-hulled boats) were the first Navy vessels deployed there

Construction of the base first involved the dredging of 300,000 cubic yards of sand, filling and compacting of the marshland, following which construction included barracks for 400 men, storage for 3,000 barrels of petrol, oil and lubricants (POL), a storage warehouse of 8,000 square feet, a communications and administration building, ammunition storage, two antenna towers, a mess-hall, a pier, and the required road, water, sewerage and power facilities. The overall construction period took 14 months, however the base began operation as construction was ongoing and by late 1966 Nhà Bè was also the base for three platoons from SEAL Team 1 and was also a Patrol Boat, River (PBR) base. By August 1967, a two-helicopter detachment from HA(L)-3 was located at the base.

On 2 January 1968 a Viet Cong (VC) 75mm recoilless-rifle attack against on the base wounded two sailors and scored a direct hit on an MSB which was destroyed.

In May 1968 Mine Squadron 11, Detachment Alpha became Mine Division 112. From September 1968 on six medium minesweepers (MSMs, formerly LCM(M)s) and four drone minesweepers (MSDs) of the newly created Mine Division 113 were based at Nhà Bè.

The base was transferred to the RVNN in April 1972.

Located on the Lòng Tàu River north of the base, the Nhà Bè fuel depot was the largest fuel storage facility in South Vietnam with approximately 80% of the nation's storage capacity. On the night of 3 December 1973 the VC hit the fuel depot with rocket fire destroying or damaging 30 fuel tanks and igniting over 600,000 barrels of fuel.

Early in 1975, the RVNN created Riverine Task Force 99 based at Nhà Bè.

The base remains in use today by the Vietnam Coast Guard.

References

External links
 Footage of the base in 1967

Buildings and structures in Ho Chi Minh City
Military installations of the United States in South Vietnam
Naval installations of the Republic of Vietnam